Kladderadatsch (onomatopoeic for "Crash") was a satirical German-language magazine first published in Berlin on 7 May 1848. It appeared weekly or as the Kladderadatsch put it: "daily, except for weekdays." It was founded by Albert Hofmann and David Kalisch, the latter the son of a Jewish merchant and the author of several works of comedy. Publication ceased in 1944.

Background
The first edition, written almost entirely by Kalisch, saw 4,000 copies printed, all of which were sold within 24 hours. Two other writers, Ernst Dohm and Rudolf Löwenstein, were then employed. Wilhelm Scholz's drawings appeared in the second edition, and would do so for the next 40 years. The magazine sold 50,000 copies in 1890 and 85,000 copies in 1911.

Originally, the Kladderadatsch was a liberal magazine, but grew more conservative over the years. During the Bismarck era, the journal supported the Chancellor's policies; during the Weimar era, its stance was German-nationalist. After the 1923 takeover by the industrialist Hugo Stinnes, the magazine's contents became increasingly right-wing and showed some sympathy with Hitler and National socialism. The magazine adopted an aggressive satirical approach towards the Jews after 1933 in line with the Nazi magazine Die Brennessel.

References

External links

 All issues of the Kladderadatsch in digitized form (pdf) available at the University of Heidelberg Library: Kladderadatsch (1848-1944)

Defunct magazines published in Germany
German-language magazines
Satirical magazines published in Germany
Magazines established in 1848
Magazines disestablished in 1944
Magazines published in Berlin
1848 establishments in Germany
1944 disestablishments in Germany
Conservative magazines published in Germany